Khulna is the third-largest city in Bangladesh, after Dhaka and Chittagong. It is the administrative centre of Khulna District and Khulna Division. Khulna's economy is the third-largest in Bangladesh, contributing $53 billion in gross state product and $95 billion in purchasing power parity (PPP) in 2020. In the 2011 census, the city had a population of 663,342.

Khulna is on the Rupsha and Bhairab Rivers. A centre of Bangladeshi industry, the city hosts many national companies. It is served by the Port of Mongla, Bangladesh's second-largest seaport. Khulna River Port is one of the country's oldest and busiest river ports.

A colonial steamboat service, which includes the Tern, Osrich and Lepcha, operates on the river route to the city. Khulna is considered the gateway to the Sundarbans, the world's largest mangrove forest and home of the Bengal tiger. It is north of the Mosque City of Bagerhat, a UNESCO World Heritage Site.

History
Khulna was part of the ancient kingdoms of Vanga and Samatata. It became a part of the Sena dynasty during the 12th-century reign of Ballala Sena, and formed part of the Bagri division of Bengal.
During the 14th century, Shamsuddin Firoz Shah was the first Muslim ruler to arrive in the city. Muslim settlements increased during the time of Shamsuddin Ilyas Shah, and many mosques and shrines were established. A Muslim saint, Khan Jahan Ali, acquired a jagir (fiefdom) encompassing a large part of Khulna Division from the king of Gauḍa during the 15th century and renamed the region as Jahanabad. Ali ruled until his death in 1459.

After Ali's death, the city became part of the Bengal Sultanate. During the reign of Daud Khan Karrani in the 16th century, Vikramaditya (one of Karrani's chief ministers) obtained a grant in southern Bengal—including Khulna—when Karrani was fighting the Mughals. Vikramaditya established a sovereign kingdom with its capital at Iswaripur (in present-day Satkhira District). He was succeeded by his son, Pratapaditya, who gained preeminence over the Baro-Bhuyans and controlled southern Bengal. Vikramaditya was defeated by Raja Man Singh I, a Hindu Rajput general of the Mughal emperor Akbar, in 1611.

Khulna was ruled by autonomous Bengali nawabs until 1793, when the British East India Company abolished nizamat (local rule) and took control of the city. Becoming part of Jessore District in 1842, it became the headquarters of Khulna District (the Khulna and Bagerhat subdivisions of Jessore district, the Satkhira subdivision of 24 Parganas district, and the Sundarbans) in 1882. Khulna had a pouroshava (municipal council) in 1884, which became a municipal corporation in 1984.

Before 19 August 1947, Khulna District was part of undivided Bengal. Khulna first declared itself as part of India in 1947, and the Indian flag was flown on 15 August. Syed Mohammad Abdul Halim (an official of the Bengali civil service) requested Khulna's inclusion in Pakistan, and the boundary commission declared that the city was part of East Bengal. Sher e Bangla A.K.Fazlul Haq, Muslim League leaders Khan A Sabur, Advocate Hamidul Haq Chowdhury, A. F. M. Abdul Jalil, and Abdul Mojid Khan were also involved in the process.

During the Bangladesh Liberation War, the Pakistan Army created the 314th ad hoc Brigade to hold Khulna. The city's Mukti Bahini fighters were part of sector 8 under the command of Major Abu Osman Chowdhury and, later, under Major Mohammad Abdul Monjur.

Geography
Khulna is Bangladesh's third-largest city, after Dhaka and Chittagong. It is in the south-western part of the country, on the Rupsha and Bhairab Rivers. Khulna is south of Jessore and Narail Districts, east of Satkhira District, west of Bagerhat and north of the Bay of Bengal. It is part of the Ganges Delta, the world's largest river delta. Sundarbans, the world's largest mangrove forest, is in the southern part of the delta. Tidal-flat ecosystems are adjacent to the city. Khulna is in the northern part of the district, and the Mayur River is the western boundary of its metropolitan area.

Climate
In the Köppen climate classification, Khulna has a tropical wet and dry climate. The city is hot and humid during summer, and pleasantly warm during winter. Khulna is significantly affected by the Monsoon of South Asia. Khulna gets less rainfall than other parts of Bangladesh, however, due to its location and the effects of the Sundarbans south of the city. Khulna also receives heavy rain from cyclones which form in the Bay of Bengal.

Administration

Khulna Municipal Council was founded on 12 December 1884. It became a municipal corporation in 1984, and a city corporation in 1990. Khulna City Corporation (KCC) is a self-governing corporation run by an elected mayor, who governs the city's 31 wards. Currently, Mr. Talukder Abdul Khaled is the mayor of Khulna City Corporation (KCC). 

The Khulna Metropolitan Police (KMP) maintains law and order and regulates traffic in the metropolitan area. It has eight police stations: Khulna Kotwali Thana, Sonadanga Thana, Khalishpur Thana, Daulatpur Thana, Khan Jahan Ali Thana, Aarongghata Thana, Horintana Thana and Labonchora Thana. The Metropolitan Magistrate Court (CMM) adjudicates the city's legal issues. The Khulna Development Authority (KDA) plans and coordinates the city's development. Khulna Water Supply & Sewerage Authority (KWASA) parallels the KCC.

Khulna has two parliamentary constituencies: Khulna-02 (Khulna Sadar Thana and Sonadanga Thana) and Khulna-03 (Khalishpur Thana, Daulatpur Thana and part of Khan Jahan Ali Thana). Khulna District and Khulna Division are headquartered in the city.

Military
Khulna is one of two principal naval-command centres for the Bangladesh Navy. The BNS Titumir naval base is in the city.

Demographics

In the 2011 census, Khulna City Corporation had a population of 751,237 in 177,852 households. Khulna had a sex ratio of 923 females to 1000 males and a literacy rate of 72.7%.

Like the rest of Bangladesh, most of the city's population is Bengali. Khulna's native residents are known as Khulnaiya. Its population also consists of people from neighboring districts (including Noakhali District), Barisal and Faridpur Divisions, and Bihar.

Most residents speak Bengali (the national language), its dialects and regional languages. English is understood by a large segment of the population, especially in business. An Urdu-speaking population, descendants of Muslims displaced from Bihar in 1947 who sought refuge in East Bengal, lives in the city's Khalishpur area.

Islam is Khulna's major religion, practiced by 90.04% of the population. Other religions are Hinduism (practiced by 8.71%), and Christianity (1.23%).

Economy

Khulna is Bangladesh's third-largest economic centre. North of the Port of Mongla, it has a variety of industries. Major sectors are jute, chemicals, fish and seafood packaging, food processing, sugar milling, power generation and shipbuilding. The Khulna Chamber of Commerce and Industry (KCCI) regulates commerce through its Licensed Measurers' Department (LMD) and certification, attestation and publicity departments. The region has an Export Processing Zone, which has attracted foreign investment. The city is home to branch offices of a number of national companies, including M. M. Ispahani Limited, BEXIMCO, James Finlay Bangladesh, Summit Power and the Abul Khair Group. Khulna's largest companies include Khulna Shipyard, Bangladesh Cable Shilpa Limited, Bangladesh Oxygen, Platinum Jubilee Mills, Star Jute Mills and the Khulna Oxygen Company.

Transport

Road

Rickshaws are the most popular means of public transport in Khulna for short trips, and auto rickshaws are also common. Nagar Paribahan buses have frequent service between Rupsha and Phultala, with stops throughout Khulna. Motorcycles are popular among the middle class, but wealthier people prefer a private car.

The N7 highway connects Khulna with the rest of Bangladesh, and the Khulna City Bypass is a major road. The R760 connects Satkhira and western Khulna Districts. There are several nationwide bus services available in Khulna (most privately owned), and the Bangladesh Road Transport Corporation operates inter-district buses from the city. Sonadanga Bus Terminal is Khulna's main bus terminal. Major bus routes include Khulna-Jessore-Dhaka; Khulna-Goplaganj-Dhaka; Khulna-Jessore-Kushtia; Khulna-Satkhira; Khulna-Bagerhat; Khulna-Mongla; Khulna-Narail; Khulna-Barisal; Khulna-Rajshahi; Khulna-Faridpur; Khulna-Kuakata, and Khulna-Dhaka-Chittagong.

Rail

Khulna Railway Station is the city's main station. Bangladesh Railway operates six intercity trains: the Sundarban and Chitra Expresses (to Dhaka), the Kapotaksha and Sagardari Expresses (to Rajshahi), and the Rupsa and Seemanta Expresses to Chilahati. Two commuter express trains serve Benapole, in addition to mail trains to Parbatipur, Chapainawabganj and Goalanda. The international Bandhan Express runs to Kolkata. The city has four other railway stations, and two more (in addition to the Rupsha Rail Bridge) are under construction as part of the Khulna–Mongla Port Railway project.

Air

Khan Jahan Ali Airport, in Bagerhat Sadar Upazila, is planned.

Water
Several passenger launches and cargo services operate from the Bangladesh Inland Water Transport Authority launch terminal in the city.

Public transport
There are being public transportation in Khulna city through mid 19's.Buses of that urban transportation of Khulna city were called as *MURIR TIN*.Today besides the urban transportational buses, Cycle rickshawauto rickshaws are playing vital role in transport within the Khulna city and adjoining metro area.Famous Ride sharing services like Uber, Pathao, Obhaialso available in the city.
There are also bus and minibus services in a some routes, connecting suburban areas of the city.Plenty of rental car agencies operate within the city and metro area, where sedans, SUVs, and micro-buses are available to hire on an hourly or daily basis.

Education

Educational institutions in the city include Khulna University of Engineering & Technology (KUET). The university, earlier known as Bangladesh Institute of Technology, Khulna, is the only engineering university in Khulna and was listed in the 2019 edition of QS Asian University Rankings. Brajalal College, founded in 1902, is the city's oldest higher-education institution. Khulna University is the only public university in Bangladesh where student politics is prohibited. There is also an agriculture university, named Khulna Agricultural University (KAU) was founded in 2019. Sheikh Hasina Medical University and Khulna Medical College (KMC) are public institutions, and North Western University, Bangladesh (NWU) and the Northern University of Business and Technology (NUBT) are private.

Sports

Cricket and football are the two most popular sports in Khulna, and the Khulna Division cricket team's home ground is in the city. Khulna's cricket Bangladesh Premier League Khulna Titans were formerly the Khulna Royal Bengals. The Khulna Abahani Club played in the Bangladesh Football Premier League for several seasons before its relegation in the 2008–09 season.

Sheikh Abu Naser Stadium, the city's international sports venue (hosting test cricket, One Day International and Twenty20 International matches), became Bangladesh's seventh test-cricket venue on 21 November 2012; it also hosts several Bangladesh Premier League matches. Khulna District Stadium hosts other domestic sports and cultural events.

Media
Print media include the Daily Purbanchal, Daily Janmabhumi, Daily Shomoyer Khobor and Dakhinanchal Protidin. The Daily Tribune is the only English-language newspaper. Electronic media include the Khulna Gazette, Protidin Shebok, Shomoyer Khobor, and Khulnapedia. Radio stations are Bangladesh Betar Khulna, Radio Today (89.6 MHz), Radio Foorti (88.0), and Radio Khulna FM (88.8).

Tourism
The Sundarbans, in Khulna District, is home to the Bengal tiger and the world's largest virgin mangrove forest. It is a UNESCO World Heritage Site.

Rabindra Complex is in the village of Dakkhindihi,  from Khulna. The home of Rabindranath Tagore's father-in-law, Beni Madhab Roy Chowdhury, Tagore visited it several times. The museum has been renovated and is administered by Bangladesh's Department of Archaeology. The Khulna Divisional Museum, founded in 1998, was established by the country's Department of Archaeology.

Notable residents

 Khan Jahan Ali – Sufi saint
 Khan A Sabur – Politician
 Prafulla Chandra Ray – Chemist
 Sheikh Razzak Ali – Lawyer, politician, deputy speaker and speaker of the Jatiyo Sangsad
 Tanvir Mokammel – Filmmaker and writer
 Firoz Mahmud- Visual artist and painter
 Nilima Ibrahim- Educationist, littérateur and social worker
 Prafulla Chandra Sen – Former West Bengal chief minister
 Sheikh Abu Naser – Politician
 Rudra Mohammad Shahidullah - Poet
 Qazi Imdadul Haq – Writer
 Humayun Kabir Balu – Renowned journalist, Freedom fighter and Ekushey Padak winner in journalism
 SM Shafiuddin Ahmed – 17th Chief of Army Staff (CAS) of Bangladesh Army
 Sheikh Salahuddin – Former cricketer
 Bishnu Chattopadhyay – Freedom fighter and peasant leader 
 Abdur Razzak – Bangladesh national cricket team member
 Manjural Islam Rana – Bangladesh national cricket team member
 Popy (Sadia Parvin Popy) – Actress, model
 Moushumi (Arifa Pervin Moushumi) – Actress, model 
 Salma Khatun – Cricketer
 Jahanara Alam – Cricketer
 Rumana Ahmed – Cricketer
 Mehedi Hasan – Cricketer
 Bibhuti Roy – Engineer
 Puja Cherry Roy – Actress
 Afif Hossain – Cricketer
 Nurul Hasan Sohan – Cricketer
 Ayasha Rahman – Cricketer
 Shukhtara Rahman – Cricketer
 Tahin Tahera – Cricketer
 Shaila Sharmin – Cricketer
 Md. Rafiqul Islam - Editor/ Secretary General: Parliament Watch
 Ziaur Rahman – Cricketer
 Mehedi Hasan Miraj, Cricketer
 Amit Majumder, Cricketer

References

External links

 Official Website of Khulna City Corporation
 Khulna District on Banglapedia
 Khulna Guide at Discovery Bangladesh
 
 

 
Populated places in Khulna Division